Sylvia Beach (14 March 1887 – 5 October 1962), born Nancy Woodbridge Beach, was an American-born bookseller and publisher who lived most of her life in Paris, where she was one of the leading expatriate figures between World War I and II.

She is known for her Paris bookstore, Shakespeare and Company, where she published James Joyce's  book, Ulysses (1922), and encouraged the publication of and sold copies of Hemingway's first book, Three Stories and Ten Poems (1923).

Early life
Beach was born in her father's parsonage in Baltimore, Maryland, United States, on 14 March 1887, the second of three daughters of Sylvester Beach and Eleanor Thomazine Orbison. She had an older sister, Holly, and a younger sister, Cyprian. Although named Nancy after her grandmother Orbison, she later decided to change her name to Sylvia.  Her maternal grandparents were missionaries to India, and her father, a Presbyterian minister, was descended from several generations of clergymen.  When the girls were young the family lived in Baltimore and in Bridgeton, New Jersey. Then in 1901, the family moved to France upon Sylvester Beach's appointment as assistant minister of the American Church in Paris and director of the American student center.

Beach spent the years 1902–1905 in Paris, returning to New Jersey in 1906 when her father became minister of the First Presbyterian Church of Princeton.  Beach made several return trips to Europe, lived for two years in Spain, and worked for the Balkan Commission of the Red Cross.  During the last years of the Great War, she was drawn back to Paris to study contemporary French literature.

Shakespeare and Company
While conducting research at the Bibliothèque Nationale, in a French literary journal Beach read of a lending library and bookshop, La Maison des Amis des Livres at 7 rue de l'Odéon, Paris VI. There she was welcomed by the owner who, to her surprise, was a plump fair-haired young woman, Adrienne Monnier. Monnier was wearing a garment that looked like a cross between a peasant's dress and a nun's habit, "with a long full skirt … and a sort of tight-fitting velvet waistcoat over a white silk blouse. She was in gray and white like her bookshop." Although Beach was dressed in a Spanish cloak and hat, Monnier said later she knew immediately that Beach was American. At that first meeting, Monnier declared, "I like America very much". Beach replied that she liked France very much. They later became lovers and lived together for 36 years until Monnier's suicide in 1955.

Beach immediately became a member of Monnier's lending library, where she regularly attended readings by authors such as André Gide,  Paul Valéry and Jules Romains. Inspired by the literary life of the Left Bank and by Monnier's efforts to promote innovative writing, Beach dreamed of starting a branch of Monnier's book shop in New York that would offer contemporary French works to American readers.  Since her only capital was US$3,000 which her mother gave her from her savings, Beach could not afford such a venture in New York. However, Paris rents were much cheaper and the exchange rates favorable, so with Monnier's help, Beach opened an English language bookstore and lending library that she named Shakespeare and Company. Four years before, Monnier had been among the first women in France to found her own bookstore. Beach's bookstore was located at 8 rue Dupuytren, Paris VI.

Shakespeare and Company quickly attracted both French and American readers, including aspiring writers to whom Beach offered hospitality and encouragement as well as books.  As the franc dropped in value and the favorable exchange rate attracted a huge influx of Americans, Beach's shop flourished and soon needed more space. In May 1921, Shakespeare and Company moved to 12 rue de l'Odéon, just across the street from Monnier's Maison des Amis des Livres.

In July 1920, Beach met Irish writer James Joyce at a dinner party hosted by French poet André Spire. Soon after, Joyce joined Beach's lending library. Joyce had been trying, unsuccessfully, to publish his manuscript for his masterpiece, Ulysses, and Beach, seeing his frustration, offered to publish it. Shakespeare and Company gained considerable fame after it published Ulysses in 1922, as a result of Joyce's inability to get an edition out in English-speaking countries. Beach would later be financially stranded when Joyce signed on with another publisher, leaving Beach in debt after she had bankrolled, and suffered severe losses from, the publication of Ulysses.

Shakespeare and Company experienced financial difficulty throughout the Great Depression of the 1930s but remained supported by wealthy friends, including Bryher. In 1936 when Beach thought that she would be forced to close her shop, André Gide organized a group of writers into a club called Friends of Shakespeare and Company. Subscribers paid 200 francs a year to attend readings at Shakespeare and Company. Although subscriptions were limited to a select group of 200 people (the maximum number the store could accommodate), the renown of the French and American authors participating in readings during those two years attracted considerable attention to the store. Beach recalled that by then, "we were so glorious with all these famous writers and all the press we received that we began to do very well in business". Violette Leduc describes meeting her and the ambiance of the shop in her autobiography La Bâtarde. Shakespeare and Company remained open after the Fall of Paris, but by the end of 1941, Beach was forced to close.
She was interned for six months during World War II at Vittel until Tudor Wilkinson managed to secure her release in February 1942. Following her release she occasionally assisted the American member of the French Resistance, Drue Leyton, in sheltering allied airmen shot down in France. Beach kept her books hidden in a vacant apartment upstairs at 12 rue de l'Odeon. Ernest Hemingway symbolically "liberated" the shop in person in 1944, but it never re-opened for business.

Later life
In 1956, Beach wrote Shakespeare and Company, a memoir of the inter-war years that details the cultural life of Paris at the time.  The book contains first-hand observations of James Joyce, D. H. Lawrence, Ernest Hemingway, Ezra Pound, T. S. Eliot, Valery Larbaud, Thornton Wilder, André Gide, Leon-Paul Fargue, George Antheil, Robert McAlmon, Gertrude Stein, Stephen Benet, Aleister Crowley, Harry Crosby, Caresse Crosby, John Quinn, Berenice Abbott, Man Ray, and many others.

After Monnier's suicide in 1955, Beach had a relationship with Camilla Steinbrugge. Although Beach's income was modest during the last years of her life, she was widely honored for her publication of Ulysses and her support of aspiring writers during the 1920s. On June 16, 1962 she opened the Martello Tower in Sandycove in Dublin (where the opening scene of Ulysses is set) as a museum. She remained in Paris until her death in 1962, and was buried in Princeton Cemetery. Her papers are archived at Princeton University.

American George Whitman opened a new bookshop in 1951 at a different location in Paris (in the rue de la Bûcherie) originally called Le Mistral, but renamed Shakespeare and Company in 1964 in honor of the late Sylvia Beach. Since his death in 2011, it has been run by his daughter Sylvia Whitman.

Notes

Sources

Further reading

External links

 Sylvia Beach Papers at the Princeton University Library
 Sylvia Beach Collection at the Harry Ransom Center at the University of Texas at Austin
 Sylvia Beach materials, correspondence, and  The James Joyce Collection at the University at Buffalo Libraries
 1919 passport photo, Sylvia Beach (courtesy Puzzlemaster, flickr.com)

1887 births
1962 deaths
20th-century American women writers
20th-century American non-fiction writers
American autobiographers
American booksellers
American expatriates in France
Burials at Princeton Cemetery
Businesspeople from Baltimore
Female wartime nurses
LGBT people from Maryland
American LGBT writers
Ulysses (novel)
Women autobiographers
American women non-fiction writers
Lost Generation writers